Cumberland Sound (Inuit: Kangiqtualuk) is an Arctic waterway in Qikiqtaaluk Region, Nunavut, Canada. It is a western arm of the Labrador Sea located between Baffin Island's Hall Peninsula and the Cumberland Peninsula. Other names are Cumberland Straits, Hogarth Sound, and Northumberland Inlet. Old Norse is ᚠᛁᛋᚦᚱᛁ ᚢᛒᚢᚴᚦᛁᛦ, fisþri ubukþiR.  

Small islands litter the stretch of water which was formed from glacial activity and meltwater produced from the receding glacier.

The only settlement located on the shore of the sound on the Cumberland Peninsula is Pangnirtung.

John Davis, the English explorer, went part way up the sound in 1585.  After that it was unvisited by Europeans until 1839, when the British whaler and explorer William Penny persuaded Eenoolooapik (brother of interpreter and guide Taqulittuq) to show him the inland sea. The Inuk had described the sound, known to him as Tenudiackbeek, as full of whales, and soon the British set up a whaling station there.

Fauna
The sound is the home of two whale species who are known to reside year-round here, The Cumberland Sound beluga and the Bowhead whale. Other notable species include mammals such as the ringed, bearded, harp, harbor and hooded seals, as well as the polar bear. Significant fish populations include Arctic char and Greenland halibut. Birds such as gulls, ducks, and geese migrate and spend the springs and summers in Cumberland Sound, while birds such as ptarmigan and ravens remain year-round.

References

Fisheries and Oceans Canada

Sounds of Qikiqtaaluk Region
Bays of Qikiqtaaluk Region
Bodies of water of Baffin Island
Labrador Sea